Rijnhaven is an above-ground subway station in the south of the city of Rotterdam. It is part of Rotterdam Metro lines D and E.

The station opened on 9 February 1968, the same date that the North-South Line (also formerly called Erasmus line), of which it is a part, was opened. Near the station, travelers can get on RET-operated bus line 77 which can bring them to the SS Rotterdam.

Rotterdam Metro stations
RandstadRail stations in Rotterdam
Railway stations opened in 1968
1968 establishments in the Netherlands
Railway stations in the Netherlands opened in the 20th century
Railway stations in the Netherlands opened in the 1960s